Ilgar Mushkiyev (born 5 October 1990, in Ganja) is an Azerbaijani judoka. 2-time world award winner, 3-time European award winner, 2-time Grand Prix champion, 2-time world cup winner, 5-time republican champion, best athlete of the year (2011), honored master of sports, and member of the Azerbaijan national team.

He won a bronze medal at the 2011 World Championships in the -60 kg division.  In the same division, he competed at the 2012 Summer Olympics, but lost in the second round to Hovhannes Davtyan.  In 2014, he won a bronze medal at the European Championships.

Achievements

References

External links
 
 

Azerbaijani male judoka
Living people
1990 births
Judoka at the 2012 Summer Olympics
Olympic judoka of Azerbaijan
Sportspeople from Ganja, Azerbaijan
Judoka at the 2015 European Games
European Games competitors for Azerbaijan
21st-century Azerbaijani people
20th-century Azerbaijani people